Lim Geum-byeol (born 23 June 1998) is a South Korean taekwondo practitioner. 

She won a gold medal in bantamweight at the 2015 World Taekwondo Championships in Chelyabinsk.

References

External links

1998 births
Living people
South Korean female taekwondo practitioners
World Taekwondo Championships medalists
21st-century South Korean women